The Saint: The Brazilian Connection is a 1989 TV film featuring Simon Dutton as Simon Templar, the crimefighter also known as The Saint. It was one of a series of Saint films produced in Australia and broadcast as part of the syndicated series Mystery Wheel of Adventure.

Plot
When a baby is kidnapped in London, The Saint follows a trail to a black-market baby ring based in Brazil.

Cast
 Simon Dutton as Simon Templar
 Gayle Hunnicutt as Mrs. Cunningham
 David Ryall as Teal
 Simon Rouse as Fraser
 Jenifer Landor as Jenny

Production
This movie was one of six 100-minute TV films starring Simon Dutton, made for London Weekend Television (LWT) in the United Kingdom. It was postponed due to poor ratings, but went out as part of The Mystery Wheel of Adventure in the United States:
 The Saint: The Blue Dulac (9 September 1989)
 The Saint in Australia (14 July 1990)
 The Saint: Wrong Number (21 July 1990)
 The Saint: The Big Bang (28 July 1990)
 The Saint: The Software Murders (4 August 1990)

Broadcast
The film was broadcast on 2 September 1989.

External links

1989 films
1989 television films
Films directed by Ian Toynton
1980s English-language films